Oulad Ayad (in berber: ⵓⵍⴰⴷ ⵄⵢⵢⴰⴷ) is a town in Fquih Ben Salah Province, Béni Mellal-Khénifra, Morocco. According to the 2004 census it has a population of 21,466.

References

Populated places in Fquih Ben Salah Province
Municipalities of Morocco